The Johnson House is a historic house at 315 Martin Street in Pine Bluff, Arkansas.  It is a two-story wood-frame structure, with a side-gable roof with clipped ends, and overhanging eaves with exposed rafter ends.  A gabled porch projects from the left front, supported by brick piers.  The entrance is framed by sidelight and transom windows.  The house was designed in 1912 by the architectural firm of Charles L. Thompson.

The house was listed on the National Register of Historic Places in 1982.

See also
National Register of Historic Places listings in Jefferson County, Arkansas

References

Houses completed in 1912
Houses in Pine Bluff, Arkansas
Houses on the National Register of Historic Places in Arkansas
National Register of Historic Places in Pine Bluff, Arkansas